The 1969 Texas A&I Javelinas football team was an American football team that represented the Texas College of Arts and Industries (now known as Texas A&M University–Kingsville) as a member of the Lone Star Conference during the 1969 NAIA football season. In its 16th year under head coach Gil Steinke, the team compiled an 11–1 record (6–1 against conference opponents), tied for the Lone Star Conference championship, and defeated  in the Champion Bowl to win the NAIA national championship.

Fourteen Texas A&I players were selected by the conference coaches as first- or second-team players on the 1969 All-Lone Star Conference football team. The first-team honorees were: defensive halfbacks Alvin Matthews (a unanimous first-team pick) and Ed Scott (All-LSC for third consecutive year); offensive end James Respondek; offensive tackle Andy Browder; offensive guard Ronald Fielding (All-LSC for second consecutive year); defensive end Don Hynds; defensive tackle Curtiss Neal; middle guard Margarito Guerrero; and linebacker Robert Young. Second-team honors went to quarterback Karl Douglas, running back Henry Glenn, end Eldridge Small, flanker Dwight Harrison, and center Tom Domel.

Alvin Matthews and Margarito Guerrero also received second-team honors on the Associated Press' Little All-America team. Robert Young received third-team honors, and Ed Scott received honorable mention.

The team played its home games at Javelina Stadium in Kingsville, Texas.

Schedule

References

Texas AandI
Texas A&M–Kingsville Javelinas football seasons
NAIA Football National Champions
Lone Star Conference football champion seasons
Texas AandI Javelinas football